Persian Gulf Residential Complex ( – Kampam Saḵūnī Khelīj-e Fārs) is a village in Gachin Rural District, in the Central District of Bandar Abbas County, Hormozgan Province, Iran. In the 2006 census, its population consisted of 412 people in 88 families.

References 

Populated places in Bandar Abbas County